The 2017 season is Bunyodkors 11th season in the Uzbek League in Uzbekistan.

Season events
On 5 May Sergey Lushan was sacked by Bunyodkor, being replaced by Mirjalol Qosimov.

Squad

Out on loan

Technical staff

Transfers

Winter

In:

Out:

Summer

In:

Out:

Competitions

Uzbek League

League table

Results summary

Results by round

Results

Uzbek Cup

Final

AFC Champions League

Play-off round

Group stage

Squad statistics

Appearances and goals

|-
|colspan="14"|Players away on loan:

|-
|colspan="14"|Players who left Bunyodkor during the season:

|}

Goal scorers

Disciplinary Record

References

Sport in Tashkent
FC Bunyodkor seasons
Bunyodkor